Working Dog Productions (originally Frontline Television Productions Pty. Ltd.) is a film and television production company based in Melbourne, Australia. It was formed in 1993 by actors Santo Cilauro, Rob Sitch, Jane Kennedy, Tom Gleisner, and producer Michael Hirsh. The company changed its name to Working Dog Productions Pty Ltd in 1996. The company's mascot is an Australian Cattle Dog.

Television

 Programs with a shaded background indicate the program is still in production.

Film

Other
In addition to television and film, Working Dog Productions have also ventured into books, stage shows, and podcasts.

Books

Books which have been published by Working Dog include, but are not limited to, mock travel guides. Books published by Working Dog include:
Molvania: A Land Untouched by Modern Dentistry by Santo Cilauro, Tom Gleisner and Rob Sitch, 2003. 
Phaic Tan: Sunstroke on a Shoestring by Santo Cilauro, Tom Gleisner and Rob Sitch, 2004. 
San Sombrero: A Land of Carnivals, Cocktails and Coups by Santo Cilauro, Tom Gleisner and Rob Sitch, 2006. 
Molvanian Baby Names: With Meanings, Derivations And Probable Pronunciations, by Santo Cilauro, Tom Gleisner and Rob Sitch 2009.

Stage
Working Dog produced the stage show The Speechmaker. The show was written by Working Dog's Sitch, Cilauro and Gleisner and had a sellout season at the Melbourne Theatre Company.

Podcasts
 Santo, Sam & Ed's Total Football Podcast (2017-present on ABC iview)
 Santo, Sam & Ed's Cup Fever! Podcast (2018 on ABC iview)

See also

List of film production companies
List of television production companies

References

External links

Film production companies of Australia
Companies based in Melbourne
Television production companies of Australia